Herbert Kent Hartley (1908–1986) was an industrial chemist who pioneered the use of polyurethane in the UK, for which he was awarded the Gold Medal of the Plastics and Rubber Institute.  He also devised an adhesive for the sticky bomb in World War 2.  He was a keen climber and helped to organise the sport in the UK, founding the Manchester University Mountaineering Club, serving as the secretary of the Mountain Rescue Committee and president of the Rucksack Club.

Fellow climber, Frank Solari, praised Hartley in his obituary for The Alpine Journal,

References

1908 births
1986 deaths
Scientists from Manchester
20th-century British chemists
20th-century British inventors
British rock climbers